Worcester Street in the City of Gloucester runs between the junction of Alvin Street and Kingsholm Road in the north and Northgate Street in the south.

The street was developed in 1822 as an alternative route to Tewkesbury to replace the narrower Hare Lane and was promoted by John Phillpotts. It is shown fully laid out on Causton's 1843 map.

Buildings
Worcester Street is the location of a number of listed buildings:

East side
 Nos. 18, 20, 22.
 Nos. 38–60.

West side
 No. 1
 No. 5
 Nos. 9-17
 Nos. 19, 21, 23.
 Nos. 25, 27, 29.

References

External links 

Streets in Gloucester